WikiLeaks is an NGO owned by Icelandic company Sunshine Press Productions ehf that runs a website that has published news leaks and classified media provided by anonymous sources. It was founded by Julian Assange, an Australian editor, publisher, and activist, who is currently fighting extradition to the United States over his work with WikiLeaks. Since September 2018, Kristinn Hrafnsson has served as its editor-in-chief. Its website stated in 2015 that it had released online 10 million documents since beginning in 2006 in Iceland. In 2019, WikiLeaks posted its last collection of original documents. Beginning in November 2022, only around 3,000 documents could be accessed.

The organisation has released a number of prominent document caches that exposed serious violations of human rights and civil liberties, including the Collateral Murder footage from the 12 July 2007 Baghdad airstrike in which Iraqi Reuters journalists were among several civilians killed by a U.S. helicopter crew. WikiLeaks is known for publishing leaks such as diplomatic cables from the United States and Saudi Arabia, emails from the governments of Syria and Turkey, corruption in Kenya and at Samherji, a multinational fishing company based in Iceland. WikiLeaks has also published documents exposing surveillance by the Central Intelligence Agency, National Security Agency and private corporations. During the 2016 U.S. presidential election campaign, WikiLeaks released emails from the Democratic National Committee and from Hillary Clinton's campaign manager, showing that the party's national committee favoured Clinton over her rival Bernie Sanders in the primaries. These releases resulted in the resignation of Debbie Wasserman Schultz as chairwoman of the Democratic National Committee (DNC) and caused significant harm to the Clinton campaign. During the campaign, WikiLeaks promoted false conspiracy theories about Hillary Clinton, the Democratic Party and the murder of Seth Rich.

WikiLeaks has won a number of awards and has been commended for exposing state and corporate secrets, increasing transparency, assisting freedom of the press, and enhancing democratic discourse while challenging powerful institutions. WikiLeaks and some of its supporters say the organisation's publications have a perfect authenticity record. The organisation has been the target of campaigns to discredit it, including aborted ones by Palantir and HBGary. WikiLeaks has also had its donation systems disrupted by problems with its payment processors. As a result, the Wau Holland Foundation helps process WikiLeaks' donations.

The organisation has been criticised for inadequately curating its content and violating the personal privacy of individuals. WikiLeaks has, for instance, revealed Social Security numbers, medical information, credit card numbers and details of suicide attempts. Various news organisations, activists, journalists and former members have also criticised the organisation over allegations of anti-semitism, an anti-Clinton and pro-Trump bias, various associations with the Russian government, a history of buying and selling leaks, and a lack of internal transparency. Journalists have also criticised the organisation for promoting false flag conspiracy theories, and its exaggerated and misleading descriptions of the contents of leaks. The CIA defined the organisation as a "non-state hostile intelligence service" after the release of Vault 7.

History

Founding 

The inspiration for WikiLeaks was Daniel Ellsberg's release of the Pentagon Papers in 1971. Assange built WikiLeaks to shorten the time between a leak and its coverage by the media. WikiLeaks was established in Australia but its servers were soon moved to Sweden and other countries that provided more legal protection for the media.

The wikileaks.org domain name was registered on 4 October 2006. The website was established and published its first document in December 2006. Its founders and early volunteers were once described as a mixture of Asian dissidents, journalists, mathematicians, and start-up company technologists from the United States, Taiwan, Europe, Australia, and South Africa. Before his arrest, WikiLeaks was usually represented in public by Julian Assange, who has described himself as "the heart and soul of this organisation, its founder, philosopher, spokesperson, original coder, organiser, financier, and all the rest".

Assange formed an informal advisory board in the early days of WikiLeaks, filling it with journalists, political activists and computer specialists. Most of the members told Wired that they hadn't done much advising and had little involvement with WikiLeaks. Several members said they didn't know they were mentioned on the site, or how they got there. Computer security expert Ben Laurie said he had been a member of the board "since before the beginning", but he wasn't "really sure what the advisory board means." Former board member Phillip Adams criticised the board, saying that Assange "has never asked for advice. The advisory board was pretty clearly window dressing, so he went for people identified with progressive policies around the place." Assange responded by calling the advisory board "pretty informal". 

When asked to join their initial advisory board, Steven Aftergood of the Federation of American Scientists declined and told TIME that "they have a very idealistic view of the nature of leaking and its impact. They seem to think that most leakers are crusading do-gooders who are single-handedly battling one evil empire or another." In January 2007, John Young was dropped from the WikiLeaks network after questioning plans for a multimillion dollar fundraising goal. He accused the organisation of being a CIA conduit and published 150 pages of WikiLeaks emails. According to Wired, the emails are full of rhetoric and arguments over creating a profile for themselves, political impact and transparency around the world.  

The initial tranche of WikiLeaks' documents came from a WikiLeaks' activist who owned a server that was a node in the Tor network. After they noticed that Chinese hackers used the network to gather information from foreign governments, the activist began recording the information. This let Assange show potential contributors that WikiLeaks was viable and say they had "received over one million documents from thirteen countries".

2010 internal dissent 

A series of resignations of key members of WikiLeaks began in September 2010, started by Assange's unliteral decision to release the Iraq War logs the next month, his internal conflicts with other members and his response to sexual assault allegations. According to Herbert Snorrason, "We found out that the level of redactions performed on the Afghanistan documents was not sufficient. I announced that if the next batch did not receive full attention, I would not be willing to cooperate."

On 25 September 2010, after being suspended by Assange for "disloyalty, insubordination and destabilisation", Daniel Domscheit-Berg, the German spokesman for WikiLeaks, told Der Spiegel that he was resigning, saying "WikiLeaks has a structural problem. I no longer want to take responsibility for it, and that's why I am leaving the project." Assange accused Domscheit-Berg of leaking information to Newsweek, with Domscheit-Berg claiming that the WikiLeaks team was unhappy with Assange's management and handling of the Afghan war document releases. Daniel Domscheit-Berg wanted greater transparency in the articles released to the public. When Domscheit-Berg resigned, several other staffers also broke with Assange to start OpenLeaks, a new leak organisation and website with a different management and distribution philosophy.

WikiLeaks and other sources later alleged that Domscheit-Berg had copied and then deleted over 3500 unpublished whistleblower communications with some communications containing hundreds of documents, including the US government's No Fly List, 5 GB of Bank of America leaks, insider information from 20 neo-Nazi organisations, evidence of torture and government abuse of a Latin American country and US intercept information for "over a hundred Internet companies". Assange stated that Domscheit-Berg had deleted video files of the Granai massacre by a US Bomber. WikiLeaks had scheduled the video for publication before its deletion.

Domscheit-Berg said he took the files from WikiLeaks because he didn't trust its security. In Domscheit-Berg's book he wrote: "To this day, we are waiting for Julian to restore security, so that we can return the material to him, which was on the submission platform." In August 2011, Domscheit-Berg claimed he permanently deleted the files "in order to ensure that the sources are not compromised." He said that WikiLeaks' claims about the Bank of America files were "false and misleading." According to Domscheit-Berg, the Bank of America files were lost because of an IT problem when one of WikiLeaks storage drives crashed and they lost it.

The Architect left with Domscheit-Berg, taking the code behind the submission system with him. WikiLeaks submissions stayed offline until 2015. Herbert Snorrason, a 25-year-old Icelandic university student, resigned after he challenged Assange on his decision to suspend Domscheit-Berg and was bluntly rebuked. Iceland MP Birgitta Jónsdóttir also left WikiLeaks, citing lack of transparency, lack of structure, and poor communication flow in the organisation. James Ball left WikiLeaks over disputes about Assange's handling of finances, and allegations including antisemitism against fellow WikiLeaks member Israel Shamir. According to the British newspaper, The Independent, at least a dozen key supporters of WikiLeaks left the website during 2010.

Campaigns to discredit WikiLeaks 

Writing for The Guardian in 2010, Nick Davies said there were low-level attempts to smear WikiLeaks, including online accusations against Assange. In 2010, Wikileaks published a US military document containing a plan to "destroy the center of gravity" of Wikileaks by attacking its trustworthiness. It suggests the identification and exposure of WikiLeaks' sources to "deter others from using WikiLeaks".

In 2010 the Bank of America employed the services of a collection of information security firms, known as Team Themis, when the bank became concerned about information that WikiLeaks held about it and was planning to release. Team Themis included private intelligence and security firms HBGary Federal, Palantir Technologies and Berico Technologies. In 2011 hacktivist group Anonymous released emails it had obtained from HBGary Federal. Among other things, the emails revealed that Team Themis had planned to sabotage with cyber attacks and discredit WikiLeaks by exposing its operations. The plans were not implemented and, after the emails were published, Palantir CEO Alex Karp issued a public apology for his company's role.

In December 2010, PayPal suspended the WikiLeaks account after the State Depatment sent them a letter. Mastercard and Visa Europe also decided to stop accepting payments to WikiLeaks. Bank of America, Amazon and Swiss bank PostFinance had previously stopped dealing with WikiLeaks. Datacell, the IT company that enabled WikiLeaks to accept credit and debit card donations, said Visa's action was the result of political pressure. WikiLeaks called this the Banking Blockade.

Cyber attacks and legal restrictions have forced WikiLeaks to change hosts several times.

Later years 
In July 2012, WikiLeaks claimed credit for a fake New York Times website and article by Bill Keller. The hoax prompted criticism from commentors and the public, who said it hurt WikiLeaks' credibility. Glenn Greenwald wrote that it might have been satire but "it doesn’t strike me as a good idea for a group that relies on its credibility when it comes to the authenticity of what they publish — and which thus far has had a stellar record in that regard — to be making boastful claims that they published forged documents. I understand and appreciate the satire, but in this case, it directly conflicts with, and undermines, the primary value of WikiLeaks." WikiLeaks said they wanted to bring attention to the banking blockade.

In January 2013 shortly after he died, WikiLeaks said that Aaron Swartz had helped WikiLeaks and talked to talked Julian Assange in 2010 and 2011. WikiLeaks also said they had "strong reasons to believe, but cannot prove" he may have been a source, possibly breaking WikiLeaks' rules about source anonymity. Wikileaks may have made the statements to imply that Swartz was targetted by the US Attorney's Office and Secret Service in order to get at WikiLeaks.

In 2013, the organisation assisted Edward Snowden (who is responsible for the 2013 mass surveillance disclosures) in leaving Hong Kong. Sarah Harrison, a WikiLeaks activist, accompanied Snowden on the flight. Scott Shane of The New York Times stated that the WikiLeaks involvement "shows that despite its shoestring staff, limited fund-raising from a boycott by major financial firms, and defections prompted by Mr. Assange's personal troubles and abrasive style, it remains a force to be reckoned with on the global stage."

In the wake of the Charlie Hebdo shooting in January 2015, the WikiLeaks Twitter account wrote that "the Jewish pro-censorship lobby legitimized attacks", referring to the trial of Maurice Sinet. In July 2016, the same account suggested that triple parentheses, or (((echoes))) – a tool used by neo-Nazis to identify Jews on Twitter, appropriated by several Jews online out of solidarity – had been used as a way for "establishment climbers" to identify one another. In leaked internal conversations, the WikiLeaks Twitter account, thought to be controlled by Assange at the time, commented on Associated Press reporter Raphael Satter who had written an article critical of WikiLeaks. WikiLeaks tweeted that "[Satter]'s always ben(sic) a rat. But he's jewish and engaged with the ((()))) issue".

In 2015, WikiLeaks began issuing "bounties" of up to $100,000 for leaks. Assange had said in 2010 that WikiLeaks didn't but "would have no problem giving sources cash" and that there were systems in Belgium to let them. WikiLeaks has issued crowd-sourced rewards for the TTIP chapters, the TPP and information on the Kunduz Massacre. WikiLeaks has issued other bounties for leaks on Troika Crisis Planning, LabourLeaks, Trump-Comey tapes, evidence of Obama administration officials destroying information, 2016 U.S. Presidential election-related information, information to get a reporter at The Intercept fired over the Reality Winner case, the U.S. Senate torture report, and documents and Sweden's vote on placing Saudi Arabia on the UN Women's Rights Commission. WikiLeaks has defended the practice with their vetting record, saying "police rewards produce results. So do journalistic rewards."

Its website stated in 2015 that it had released online 10 million documents.

On 17 October 2016, WikiLeaks announced that a "state party" had severed the Internet connection of Julian Assange at the Ecuadorian embassy. WikiLeaks blamed United States Secretary of State John Kerry of pressuring the Ecuadorian government in severing Assange's Internet, an accusation which the United States State Department denied. The Ecuadorian government stated that it had "temporarily" severed Assange's Internet connection because of WikiLeaks' release of documents "impacting on the U.S. election campaign," although it also stated that this was not meant to prevent WikiLeaks from operating.

Administration 

WikiLeaks describes itself as "an uncensorable system for untraceable mass document leaking" and "a project of the Sunshine Press," a non-profit organisation based in Iceland. In 2010, Julian Assange and Kristinn Hrafnsson registered Sunshine Press Productions ehf as a business without a headquarters in Iceland. Assange serves as the Director of Sunshine Press Productions ehf and is on the board of directors with Hrafnsson and Ingi Ragnar Ingason. Gavin MacFadyen was a deputy board member. According to a January 2010 interview, the WikiLeaks team then consisted of five people working full-time and about 800 people who worked occasionally, none of whom were compensated.

Despite some public confusion, related to the fact both sites use the "wiki" name and website design template, WikiLeaks and Wikipedia are not affiliated. Wikia, a for-profit corporation affiliated loosely with the Wikimedia Foundation, purchased several WikiLeaks-related domain names as a "protective brand measure" in 2007.

In November 2022, many of WikiLeaks releases disappeared from the website, bringing the number of documents from around 10 million to around 3,000. Other reported issues with the site included the websites search ability not working and a broken submission page.

Editorial policy 
WikiLeaks established an editorial policy that accepted only documents that were "of political, diplomatic, historical or ethical interest" (and excluded "material that is already publicly available"). This coincided with early criticism that having no editorial policy would drive out good material with spam and promote "automated or indiscriminate publication of confidential records". The original FAQ is no longer in effect, and no one can post or edit documents on WikiLeaks. Now, submissions to WikiLeaks are reviewed by anonymous WikiLeaks reviewers, and documents that do not meet the editorial criteria are rejected. By 2008, the revised FAQ stated: "Anybody can post comments to it. [...] Users can publicly discuss documents and analyse their credibility and veracity." After the 2010 reorganisation, posting new comments on leaks was no longer possible.

According to WikiLeaks, the goal of the organisation is "to bring important news and information to the public … One of our most important activities is to publish original source material alongside our news stories so readers and historians alike can see evidence of the truth." It also seeks to ensure that journalists and whistleblowers are not prosecuted for emailing sensitive or classified documents. The online "drop box" is described by the WikiLeaks website as "an innovative, secure and anonymous way for sources to leak information to [WikiLeaks] journalists".

An embargo agreement made by WikiLeaks in 2012 included a timeline for when emails could be written about, due in part to "elections around the world and legal matters WikiLeaks and Julian are involved in." In 2017, WikiLeaks told Foreign Policy that they sometimes scheduled releases around high-profile events.

In response to a question in 2010 about whether WikiLeaks would release information that he knew might get someone killed, Assange said that he had instituted a "harm-minimization policy." This policy meant that people named in some documents might be contacted before publication to warn them, but that there were also times were members of WikiLeaks might have "blood on our hands." One member of WikiLeaks told The New Yorker they were initially uncomfortable with Assange's editorial policy, but changed her mind because she thought no one had been unjustly harmed.

In an August 2010 open letter, the non-governmental organisation Reporters Without Borders praised WikiLeaks' past usefulness in exposing "serious violations of human rights and civil liberties" but criticised the organisation over a perceived absence of editorial control, stating "Journalistic work involves the selection of information. The argument with which you defend yourself, namely that WikiLeaks is not made up of journalists, is not convincing."

In a 2013 resolution, the International Federation of Journalists, a trade union of journalists, called WikiLeaks a "new breed of media organisation" that "offers important opportunities for media organisations". Harvard professor Yochai Benkler praised WikiLeaks as a new form of journalistic enterprise, testifying at the court-martial of Chelsea Manning that "WikiLeaks did serve a particular journalistic function," and that the "range of the journalist's privilege" is "a hard line to draw".

Others do not consider WikiLeaks to be journalistic in nature. Media ethicist Kelly McBride of the Poynter Institute for Media Studies wrote in 2011: "WikiLeaks might grow into a journalist endeavor. But it's not there yet." Bill Keller of The New York Times considers WikiLeaks to be a "complicated source" rather than a journalistic partner. Prominent First Amendment lawyer Floyd Abrams writes that WikiLeaks is not a journalistic organisation, but instead "an organization of political activists; … a source for journalists; and … a conduit of leaked information to the press and the public". In support of his opinion, referring to Assange's statements that WikiLeaks reads only a small fraction of information before deciding to publish it, Abrams wrote: "No journalistic entity I have ever heard of—none—simply releases to the world an elephantine amount of material it has not read."

Financing 

WikiLeaks is a self-described not-for-profit organisation, funded largely by volunteers, and is dependent on private donations, exclusivity contracts and concessions from their media partners. Its main financing methods include conventional bank transfers and online payment systems. According to Assange, WikiLeaks' lawyers often work pro bono. Assange has said that in some cases legal aid has been donated by media organisations such as the Associated Press, the Los Angeles Times, and the National Newspaper Publishers Association. Assange said in early 2010 that WikiLeaks' only revenue consists of donations, but it has considered other options including auctioning early access to documents. In September 2010, Assange said that WikiLeaks received millions of dollars in media partnerships, explaining they "win concessions in relation to the number of journalists that will be put on it and how big they'll run with it."

In 2010, Assange said the organisation was registered as a library in Australia, a foundation in France, and a newspaper in Sweden, and that it also used two United States-based non-profit 501c3 organisations for funding purposes.

In January 2010, WikiLeaks temporarily shut down its website while management appealed for donations. Previously published material was no longer available, although some could still be accessed on unofficial mirror websites. WikiLeaks stated that it would resume full operation once the operational costs were paid. WikiLeaks saw this as a kind of work stoppage "to ensure that everyone who is involved stops normal work and actually spends time raising revenue". While the organisation initially planned for funds to be secured by 6 January 2010, it was not until 3 February 2010 that WikiLeaks announced that its minimum fundraising goal had been achieved.

On 22 January 2010, the Internet payment intermediary PayPal suspended WikiLeaks' donation account and froze its assets. WikiLeaks said that this had happened before, and was done for "no obvious reason". In December 2010, PayPal suspended WikiLeaks' account, thereby stopping donations through PayPal. PayPal said it had taken action after the US State Department sent a letter to Wikileaks stating that Wikileaks' activities were illegal in the US. Hendrik Fulda, vice-president of the Wau Holland Foundation, said that the Foundation had been receiving twice as many donations through PayPal as through normal banks before PayPal's decision to suspend WikiLeaks' account. Mastercard and Visa Europe also decided to stop accepting payments to WikiLeaks. Bank of America, Amazon and Swiss bank PostFinance had previously stopped dealing with WikiLeaks. Datacell, the IT company that enabled WikiLeaks to accept credit and debit card donations, threatened Mastercard and Visa with legal action to enforce the resumption of payments to WikiLeaks. Datacell said Visa's action was the result of political pressure.

The Wau Holland Foundation, one of the WikiLeaks' main funding channels, stated that they received more than €900,000 in public donations between October 2009 and December 2010, of which €370,000 has been passed on to WikiLeaks. Hendrik Fulda, vice-president of the Wau Holland Foundation, said that every new WikiLeaks publication brought "a wave of support", and that donations were strongest in the weeks after WikiLeaks started publishing leaked diplomatic cables. According to Assange, WikiLeaks' media partnerships for the cables earned them almost $2 million three months after they started publishing. In December 2010, the Wau Holland Foundation stated that Julian Assange and three other permanent employees had begun to receive salaries.

During 2010, WikiLeaks received over $1.9 million in donations. About $930,000 came through PayPal donations, with the rest coming through bank transfers. In 2011, donations dropped sharply and WikiLeaks received only around $180,000 in donations, while their expenses increased from $519,000 to $850,000. In 2012, WikiLeaks raised only $68,000 through the Wau Holland Foundation and had expenses more than $507,000. Between January and May 2013, Wau Holland Foundation was only able to cover $47,000 in essential infrastructure for WikiLeaks, but not an additional $400,000 that was submitted "to cover publishing campaigns and logistics in 2012".

Assange noted that the financial blockade by Bank of America, Visa, MasterCard, PayPal and Western Union, had cost WikiLeaks ninety-five per cent of its revenue. In July 2011, WikiLeaks filed a complaint against Visa and MasterCard with the European Commission. In 2012, an Icelandic district court ruled that Valitor, the Icelandic partner of Visa and MasterCard, was violating the law when it stopped accepting credit card donations to WikiLeaks. The court ruled that donations to WikiLeaks must resume within 14 days or Valitor would be fined US$6,000 a day.

In response to the financial blockade of Wikileaks, Glenn Greenwald and others created the Freedom of the Press Foundation in order "to block the US government from ever again being able to attack and suffocate an independent journalistic enterprise the way it did with WikiLeaks".

During September 2011, WikiLeaks began auctioning items on eBay to raise funds.

ikileaks started accepting bitcoin in 2011 as a currency which could not be blocked by financial intuitions or a government.By October 2017, WikiLeaks founder Julian Assange said the organisation had made a 50,000% return on Bitcoin. By that December, they had raised at least $25 million in Bitcoin.

Hosting 

In 2010, the website was available on multiple servers, different domain names and had an official dark web version (available on the Tor Network) as a result of a number of denial-of-service attacks and its elimination from different Domain Name System (DNS) providers.

Until August 2010, WikiLeaks was hosted by PRQ, a company based in Sweden providing "highly secure, no-questions-asked hosting services". PRQ was reported by The Register website to have "almost no information about its clientele and maintains few if any of its own logs". Later, WikiLeaks was hosted mainly by the Swedish Internet service provider Bahnhof in the Pionen facility, a former nuclear bunker in Sweden. Other servers are spread around the world with the main server located in Sweden.

After the site became the target of a denial-of-service attack on its old servers, WikiLeaks moved its website to Amazon's servers. Amazon later removed the website from its servers. In a public statement, Amazon said that WikiLeaks was not following its terms of service. The company stated: "There were several parts they were violating. For example, our terms of service state that 'you represent and warrant that you own or otherwise control all of the rights to the content ... that use of the content you supply does not violate this policy and will not cause injury to any person or entity.' It's clear that WikiLeaks doesn't own or otherwise control all the rights to this classified content." WikiLeaks was then moved to servers at OVH, a private web-hosting service in France. After criticism from the French government, a judge in Paris ruled that there was no need for OVH to cease hosting WikiLeaks without more information.

WikiLeaks used EveryDNS, but was dropped by the company after distributed denial-of-service (DDoS) attacks against WikiLeaks hurt the quality of service for its other customers. Supporters of WikiLeaks waged verbal and DDoS attacks on EveryDNS. Because of a typographical error in blogs mistaking EveryDNS for competitor EasyDNS, the sizeable Internet backlash hit EasyDNS. Despite that, EasyDNS began providing WikiLeaks with DNS service on "two 'battle hardened' servers" to protect the quality of service for its other customers.

Insurance files 
WikiLeaks has used heavily encrypted files to protect their publications against censorship, to pre-release publications, and as protection against arrest. The files have been described as "insurance", a "dead man's switch", "a kind of doomsday option", and a "poison pill". The insurance files sometimes come with pre-commitment hashes.

WikiLeaks staff have said that "insurance files are encrypted copies of unpublished documents submitted to us. We do this periodically, and especially at moments of high pressure on us, to ensure the documents can not be lost and history preserved. You will not be able to see the contents of any of our insurance files, until and unless the we are in a position where we must release the key. But you can download them and help spread them to ensure their safe keeping."

On 29 July 2010 WikiLeaks added an "Insurance file" to the Afghan War Diary page. The file is AES encrypted. There has been speculation that it was intended to serve as insurance in case the WikiLeaks website or its spokesman Julian Assange are incapacitated, upon which the passphrase could be published. After the first few days' release of the US diplomatic cables starting 28 November 2010, the US television broadcasting company CBS predicted that "If anything happens to Assange or the website, a key will go out to unlock the files. There would then be no way to stop the information from spreading like wildfire because so many people already have copies." CBS correspondent Declan McCullagh stated, "What most folks are speculating is that the insurance file contains unreleased information that would be especially embarrassing to the US government if it were released."

In August 2013, WikiLeaks posted three insurance files as torrents, totalling 400 gigabytes. WikiLeaks said they "encrypted versions of upcoming publication data ("insurance") from time to time to nullify attempts at prior restraint."

In June 2016, WikiLeaks posted an 88 gigabyte insurance file. On 16 October 2016, WikiLeaks tweeted an insurance file about Ecuador. In November, they posted insurance files for the US, the UK and Ecuador, and an unlabelled 90 gigabyte insurance file was posted.

In January 2017, On 7 March 2017, WikiLeaks posted an encrypted file containing the Vault 7 Year Zero release. WikiLeaks had planned to release them later, but released them online later that day because of cyber attacks. The password, SplinterItIntoAThousandPiecesAndScatterItIntoTheWinds, was a reference to an alleged quote by President Kennedy.

Staff 
As of June 2009, the website had more than 1,200 registered volunteers.

Daniel Domscheit-Berg, Sarah Harrison,  Kristinn Hrafnsson and Joseph Farrell are notable people who have been involved in the project. Harrison is also a member of Sunshine Press Productions along with Assange and Ingi Ragnar Ingason. Gavin MacFadyen was acknowledged by Assange as a ″beloved director of WikiLeaks″ shortly after his death in 2016. Jacob Appelbaum is the only known American who is known to have been member of WikiLeaks, acting as a senior editor and spokesman. Gottfrid Svartholm had worked with WikiLeaks as a technical consultant and managed infrastructure critical to the organization. He was also listed as part of the "decryption and transmission team" on Collateral Murder and credited for "networking" and helped with several other unknown endeavors. Rop Gonggrijp, Birgitta Jónsdóttir, Smári McCarthy and Herbert Snorrason are WikiLeaks volunteers and members who the US government has tried to surveill with court orders. WikiLeaks was represented in Russia by Israel Shamir and in Sweden by his son Johannes Wahlström.

According to colleagues and former WikiLeaks insiders, the WikiLeaks dropbox architecture was rebuilt by a WikiLeaks programmer known to most insiders as "The Architect". He also instructed another WikiLeaks technician, and some of colleagues thought he was a computer genius. According to Andy Greenberg, insiders told him "when The Architect joined WikiLeaks it was a mess. It was two creaking servers without all the flashy security that Assange had promised in interviews with the media. The Architect rebuilt it from scratch." According to Wired, "WikiLeaks had been running on a single server with sensitive backend components like the submission and e-mail archives connected to the public-facing Wiki page. The Architect separated the platforms and set up a number of servers in various countries."

In August 2011, WikiLeaks volunteer Sigurdur Thordarson, working in his home country Iceland, contacted the FBI and, after presenting a copy of Assange's passport at the American embassy, became the first informant to work for the FBI from inside WikiLeaks, and gave the FBI several hard drives he had copied from Assange and core WikiLeaks members. In November 2011, WikiLeaks dismissed Thordarson due to his embezzlement of $50,000, to which charge (along with several other offences) he later pleaded guilty in an Icelandic court. According to Thordarson, a few months after his dismissal by WikiLeaks the FBI agreed to pay him $5,000 as compensation for work missed while meeting with agents.

On 26 September 2018, it was announced that Julian Assange had appointed Kristinn Hrafnsson as editor-in-chief of WikiLeaks with Assange continuing as its publisher.

Submissions 
WikiLeaks restructured its process for contributions after its first document leaks did not gain much attention. Assange stated this was part of an attempt to take the voluntary effort typically seen in Wiki projects and "redirect it to ... material that has real potential for change". Before this, the Wikileaks FAQ, under "How will Wikileaks operate?", read as of February 2007:

WikiLeaks originally used a "wiki" communal publication method, which ended by May 2010. 

In 2010 Assange said WikiLeaks received some submissions through the postal mail. That year, Julian Assange said that the servers were located in Sweden and the other countries "specifically because those nations offer legal protection to the disclosures made on the site". He talks about the Swedish constitution, which gives the information–providers total legal protection. It is forbidden, according to Swedish law, for any administrative authority to make inquiries about the sources of any type of newspaper. These laws, and the hosting by PRQ, were meant to make it difficult for any authority to eliminate WikiLeaks; they place a burden of proof upon any complainant whose suit would circumscribe WikiLeaks' liberty. Furthermore, "WikiLeaks maintains its own servers at undisclosed locations, keeps no logs and uses military-grade encryption to protect sources and other confidential information." Such arrangements have been called "bulletproof hosting".

According to some, The Architect was the engineer who rebuilt the WikiLeaks submission system "from scratch" and instructed another WikiLeaks technician. According to Andy Greenberg and Wired, when The Architect joined WikiLeaks, it "was a mess" running on one or two servers "without all the flashy security that Assange had promised in interviews with the media." The Architect rebuilt it from scratch and separated the sensitive platforms from the public-facing Wiki "and set up a number of servers in various countries."

During the 2010 reorganisation, The Architect left with Domscheit-Berg, taking the code behind the submission system with him. Assange said that the submission system was temporarily down because its backlog was too big. WikiLeaks later said it was down because of Domscheit-Berg's "acts of sabotage" when he left the organisation, which had forced WikiLeaks to "overhaul the entire submission system", and the staff lacked time to do so.

WikiLeaks submissions stayed offline for four and a half years, until May 2015. While it was offline, WikiLeaks announced they were building a state-of-the-art secure submission system. The launch of the new system was delayed by security concerns in 2011. During this time, WikiLeaks continued to publish documents. These publications originated from material which had been directly shared with WikiLeaks by hackers, or were the result of Wikileaks organising and republishing already-public leaks. A former WikiLeaks associate said that Andy Müller-Maguhn and a colleague administered the submission server in 2016, though Müller-Maguhn denies this. That October, WikiLeaks suggested "lawyer to lawyer" as an alternate submission method.

By October 2021, WikiLeaks' secure chat stopped working and by February 2022, WikiLeaks' submission system and email server were offline. In July 2022, a broken version of the submission system briefly relaunched with expired PGP keys and went offline after it was reported on by The Daily Dot.

Legal status 

The legal status of WikiLeaks is complex. In 2010, WikiLeaks set up a private limited company in Iceland for administrative purposes, according to a long-time spokesman and later editor-in-chief. The organisation was also creating legal entities in France and Sweden, and operated in Australia.

Assange considers WikiLeaks a protection intermediary. Rather than leaking directly to the press, and fearing exposure and retribution, whistleblowers can leak to WikiLeaks, which then leaks to the press for them. In December 2010, the Australian Prime Minister Julia Gillard said that "I absolutely condemn the placement of this information on the WikiLeaks website - it's a grossly irresponsible thing to do and an illegal thing to do". After criticism and a revolt within her party, she said she was referring to "the original theft of the material by a junior U.S. serviceman rather than any action by Mr Assange".

On 2 September 2011, Australia's attorney general, Robert McClelland released a statement that the US diplomatic cables published by Wikileaks identified at least one ASIO officer, and that it was a crime in Australia to publish information which could identify an intelligence officer. McClelland said that "On occasions before this week, WikiLeaks redacted identifying features where the safety of individuals or national security could be put at risk. It appears this hasn't occurred with documents that have been distributed across the internet this week." According to The Guardian and Al Jazeera, this meant "Julian Assange could face prosecution in Australia."

The Australian Federal Police later said that the release of the cables by WikiLeaks breached no Australian laws.

United States criminal investigations 
The US Justice Department began a criminal investigation of WikiLeaks and Julian Assange soon after the leak of diplomatic cables in 2010 began. The Washington Post reported that the department was considering charges under the Espionage Act of 1917, an action which former prosecutors characterised as "difficult" because of First Amendment protections for the press. Several Supreme Court cases (e.g. Bartnicki v. Vopper) have established previously that the American Constitution protects the re-publication of illegally gained information provided the publishers did not themselves violate any laws in acquiring it.

Regarding legal threats against WikiLeaks and Assange, legal expert Ben Saul said that Assange is the target of a global smear campaign to demonise him as a criminal or as a terrorist, without any legal basis. The US Center for Constitutional Rights issued a statement expressing alarm at the "multiple examples of legal overreach and irregularities" in his arrest.

In 2010, the NSA added Assange to its Manhunting Timeline. By August 2010, the Pentagon had concluded that the Afghan War documents leak broke the law. A letter from the Department of Defence general counsel said that "it is the view of the Department of Defence that WikiLeaks obtained this material in circumstances that constitute a violation of US law, and that as long as WikiLeaks holds this material, the violation of the law is ongoing."

In 2011, a WikiLeaks volunteer became an FBI informant and Google was served with search warrants for the contents of two WikiLeaks volunteers' email accounts. The NSA discussed categorising WikiLeaks as a "malicious foreign actor" for surveillance purposes.

On 14 December 2010 the United States Department of Justice issued a subpoena directing Twitter to provide information for accounts registered to or associated with WikiLeaks. Twitter decided to notify its users. 

By 2013,  Jérémie Zimmermann, Smári McCarthy, Jacob Appelbaum, David House and Jennifer Robinson had been detained and interrogated or approached when attempts were made to recruit them as informants, often using heavy handed tactics.

In 2015, it was revealed that Google had been served with search warrants for the contents of three WikiLeaks staff members' email accounts as part of a criminal investigation with alleged offences including espionage, conspiracy to commit espionage, the theft or conversion of property belonging to the United States government, violation of the Computer Fraud and Abuse Act, and criminal conspiracy.

In April 2017, CIA director Mike Pompeo called WikiLeaks "a non-state hostile intelligence service often abetted by state actors like Russia". The official designation of Wikileaks and Julian Assange as a non-state hostile intelligence service was discussed in mid-2017 during preparation of the Intelligence Authorization Act for Fiscal Year 2018. It was eventually incorporated into the National Defense Authorization Act for Fiscal Year 2020 that became law in December 2019. The Act says "It is the sense of Congress that WikiLeaks and the senior leadership of WikiLeaks resemble a non-state hostile intelligence service often abetted by state actors and should be treated as such a service by the United States." In the opinion of some former officials, the designation allowed the CIA to launch and plan operations that did not require presidential approval or congressional notice.

In September 2021, Yahoo! News reported that in 2017 in the wake of the Vault 7 leaks, the CIA discussed plans to kidnap or assassinate Julian Assange. They also planned to spy on associates of WikiLeaks, sow discord among its members, and steal their electronic devices. "[T]op intelligence officials lobbied the White House" to designate Wikileaks as an "information broker" to allow for more investigative tools against it, "potentially paving the way" for its prosecution. Laura Poitras described attempts to classify herself and Assange as "information brokers" rather than journalists as "bone-chilling and a threat to journalists worldwide". Former CIA Director Mike Pompeo stated that the US officials who had spoken to Yahoo should be prosecuted for exposing CIA activities.

In November 2018, an accidental filing with Assange's name was seen to indicate there were undisclosed charges against him. On 11 April 2019, Assange was charged in a computer hacking conspiracy. On 23 May, a superseding indictment was filed with charges of Conspiracy to Receive National Defense Information, Obtaining National Defense Information, Disclosure of National Defense Information, and Conspiracy to Commit Computer Intrusion. On 24 June 2020, another superseding indictment was filed which added to the allegations but not the charges.

After the indictment against Assange was unsealed, the Department of Justice continued to investigate Wikileaks. The day after charging Assange, prosecutors contacted Domscheit-Berg. Prosecutors also spoke with David House for about 90 minutes, who had previously testified to the grand jury in exchange for immunity. Chelsea Manning and Jeremy Hammond refused to testify for the grand jury.

In early 2019, the Mueller report wrote the Special Counsel's office considered charging WikiLeaks or Assange "as conspirators in the computer-intrusion conspiracy and that there were "factual uncertainties" about the role that Assange may have played in the hacks or their distribution that were "the subject of ongoing investigations" by the US Attorney’s Office.

Use of leaked documents in court 

In April 2011, the US Department of Justice warned military lawyers acting for Guantanamo Bay detainees against clicking of links on sites such as The New York Times that might lead to classified files published by WikiLeaks. In June 2011, the US Department of Justice ruled that attorneys acting for Guantanamo Bay detainees could cite documents published by WikiLeaks. The use of the documents was subject to restrictions.

On 8 February 2018, the UK Supreme Court unanimously allowed a document that had been leaked through WikiLeaks to be admitted as evidence. The cable had been excluded from use in an earlier part of the case before the Administrative Court based on the fact that it was a diplomatic communication, which enjoy "inviolable" protections that prevent them from being used in court outside of exceptional circumstances. The Supreme Court ruled that since the document had already been widely disseminated, it had lost any protections it might have had. The hearing was considered an important test of the Vienna Convention in relation to WikiLeaks documents.

Lawsuit by the Democratic National Committee 

On 20 April 2018, the Democratic National Committee filed a multimillion-dollar lawsuit in federal district court in Manhattan against Russia, the Trump campaign, WikiLeaks and Julian Assange, alleging a conspiracy to disrupt the 2016 United States presidential election in Trump's favour. The suit was dismissed with prejudice on 30 July 2019. In his judgement, Judge John Koeltl said that WikiLeaks "did not participate in any wrongdoing in obtaining the materials in the first place" and therefore was within the law in publishing the information. The federal judge also wrote "The DNC's interest in keeping 'donor lists' and 'fundraising strategies' secret is dwarfed by the newsworthiness of the documents as a whole...If WikiLeaks could be held liable for publishing documents concerning the DNC's political financial and voter-engagement strategies simply because the DNC labels them 'secret' and trade secrets, then so could any newspaper or other media outlet".

Publications

2006–2008 

 WikiLeaks posted its first document in December 2006, a decision to assassinate Somali government officials signed by rebel leader Sheikh Hassan Dahir Aweys. Assange and WikiLeaks were uncertain of its authenticity, and the document’s authenticity was never determined.
 In August 2007, the UK newspaper The Guardian published a story about corruption by the family of the former Kenyan leader Daniel arap Moi based on information provided via WikiLeaks.
 In November 2007, a March 2003 copy of Standard Operating Procedures for Camp Delta detailing the protocol of the US Army at the Guantanamo Bay detention camp was released. The document revealed that some prisoners were off-limits to the International Committee of the Red Cross, something that the US military had in the past denied repeatedly. The Guantánamo Bay Manual included procedures for transferring prisoners and methods of evading protocols of the Geneva convention.
 In February 2008, WikiLeaks released allegations of illegal activities at the Cayman Islands branch of the Swiss Bank Julius Baer, which resulted in the bank suing WikiLeaks and obtaining an injunction which temporarily suspended the operation of wikileaks.org. The California judge had the service provider of WikiLeaks block the site's domain (wikileaks.org) on 18 February 2008, although the bank only wanted the documents to be removed but WikiLeaks had failed to name a contact. The website was instantly mirrored by supporters, and later that month the judge overturned his previous decision citing First Amendment concerns and questions about legal jurisdiction.
 In March 2008, WikiLeaks published what they referred to as "the collected secret 'bibles' of Scientology", and three days later received letters threatening to sue them for breach of copyright.
 In September 2008, during the 2008 United States presidential election campaigns, the contents of a Yahoo account belonging to Sarah Palin (the running mate of Republican presidential nominee John McCain) were posted on WikiLeaks after being hacked by 4chan user David Kernell.
 In November 2008, the membership list of the far-right British National Party was posted to WikiLeaks, after appearing briefly on a weblog. A year later, in October 2009, another list of BNP members was leaked, said by the BNP’s leader, Nick Griffin, to be a ‘malicious forgery’.

2009 

 During 2008 and 2009, WikiLeaks published lists of forbidden or illegal web addresses for Australia, Denmark and Thailand. These were originally created to prevent access to child pornography and terrorism, but the leaks revealed that other sites featuring unrelated subjects were also listed.
 In January 2009, WikiLeaks released 86 telephone intercept recordings of Peruvian politicians and businessmen involved in the 2008 Peru oil scandal.
 In February, WikiLeaks cracked the encryption to and published NATO's Master Narrative for Afghanistan and three other classified or restricted NATO documents on the Pentagon Central Command (CENTCOM) site.
 During February, WikiLeaks released 6,780 Congressional Research Service reports followed in March by a set of documents belonging to Barclays Bank that had been ordered removed from the website of The Guardian.
 In July, WikiLeaks released a report disclosing a "serious nuclear accident" at the Iranian Natanz nuclear facility. According to media reports, the accident may have been the direct result of a cyber-attack at Iran's nuclear program, carried out with the Stuxnet computer worm, a cyber-weapon allegedly built jointly by the United States and Israel.
 In September, internal documents from Kaupthing Bank were leaked, from shortly before the collapse of Iceland's banking sector, which had caused the 2008–2012 Icelandic financial crisis. The document showed that suspiciously large sums of money were loaned to various owners of the bank, and large debts written off.
 In October, Joint Services Protocol 440, a British document advising the security services on how to avoid documents being leaked, was published by WikiLeaks. Later that month, it announced that a super-injunction was being used by the commodities company Trafigura to stop The Guardian (London) from reporting on a leaked internal document regarding a toxic dumping incident in Côte d'Ivoire.
 In November, released 570,000 intercepts of pager messages sent on the day of the 11 September attacks. These included messages sent from the Pentagon, the FBI, the Federal Emergency Management Agency and the NYPD, in response to the disaster.

2010 

In mid-February 2010, WikiLeaks received a leaked diplomatic cable from the United States Embassy in Reykjavik relating to the Icesave scandal, which they published on 18 February. The cable, known as Reykjavik 13, was the first of the classified documents WikiLeaks published among those allegedly provided to them by United States Army Private Chelsea Manning. In March 2010, WikiLeaks released a secret 32-page US Department of Defense Counterintelligence Analysis Report written in March 2008 discussing the leaking of material by WikiLeaks and how it could be deterred.

In April, a classified video of the 12 July 2007 Baghdad airstrike was released, showing two Reuters employees being fired at, after the pilots mistakenly thought the men were carrying weapons, which were in fact cameras. After the men were killed, the video shows US forces firing on a family van that stopped to pick up the bodies. Press reports of the number killed in the attacks vary from 12 to "over 18". Among the dead were two journalists and two children were also wounded.

In June 2010, Manning was arrested after alleged chat logs were given to United States authorities by former hacker Adrian Lamo, in whom she had confided. Manning reportedly told Lamo she had leaked the "Collateral Murder" video, in addition to a video of the Granai airstrike and about 260,000 diplomatic cables, to WikiLeaks.

In July, WikiLeaks released 92,000 documents related to the war in Afghanistan between 2004 and the end of 2009 to the publications The Guardian, The New York Times and Der Spiegel. The documents detail individual incidents including "friendly fire" and civilian casualties. WikiLeaks asked the Pentagon and human-rights groups to help remove names from the documents to reduce the potential harm caused by their release, but did not receive assistance.

After the Love Parade stampede in Duisburg, Germany, on 24 July 2010, a local resident published internal documents of the city administration regarding the planning of Love Parade. The city government reacted by securing a court order on 16 August forcing the removal of the documents from the website on which it was hosted. On 20 August 2010, WikiLeaks released a publication entitled Loveparade 2010 Duisburg planning documents, 2007–2010, which consisted of 43 internal documents regarding the Love Parade 2010.

After the leak of information concerning the Afghan War, in October 2010, around 400,000 documents relating to the Iraq War were released. The BBC quoted the US Department of Defense referring to the Iraq War Logs as "the largest leak of classified documents in its history". Media coverage of the leaked documents emphasised claims that the US government had ignored reports of torture by the Iraqi authorities during the period after the 2003 war.

Diplomatic cables release 

On 28 November 2010, WikiLeaks and El País, Le Monde, Der Spiegel, The Guardian, and The New York Times started simultaneously to publish the first 220 of 251,287 leaked documents labelled confidential – but not top-secret – and dated from 28 December 1966 to 28 February 2010.

The contents of the diplomatic cables include numerous unguarded comments and revelations regarding: US diplomats gathering personal information about Ban Ki-moon, Secretary-General of the United Nations, and other top UN officials; critiques and praises about the host countries of various United States embassies; political manoeuvring regarding climate change; discussion and resolutions towards ending ongoing tension in the Middle East; efforts and resistance towards nuclear disarmament; actions in the War on Terror; assessments of other threats around the world; dealings between various countries; United States intelligence and counterintelligence efforts; and other diplomatic actions. Reactions to the United States diplomatic cables leak varied. The overthrow of the presidency in Tunisia of 2011 has been attributed partly to reaction against the corruption revealed by leaked cables.

According to the former US Ambassador to Cameroon from 2004 to 2007, Niels Marquardt, Marafa Hamidou Yaya was arrested on "entirely unproven corruption charges", subjected to a "kangaroo court", and given a 25-year prison sentence. Marquardt said Marafa's only real crime was having told him that he "might be interested" in the presidency one day. According to Marquardt, when Wikileaks released the cable in which this was mentioned, it became front-page news in Cameroon and led directly to Marafa's arrest. The U.S. ambassador at the time, Robert Jackson, said Marafa's trial didn't specify the evidence against him.

Unredacted cable release 
In August 2010, Assange gave Guardian journalist David Leigh an encryption key and a URL where he could locate the file containing the U.S. diplomatic cables. In February 2011 David Leigh and Luke Harding of The Guardian published the book WikiLeaks: Inside Julian Assange's War on Secrecy containing the encryption key. Leigh said he believed the key was a temporary one that would expire within days. Wikileaks supporters disseminated the encrypted files to mirror sites in December 2010 after Wikileaks experienced cyber-attacks. When Wikileaks learned what had happened it notified the US State Department. On 25 August 2011, the German magazine Der Freitag published an article giving details which would enable people to piece the information together.

On 29 August, WikiLeaks published over 130,000 unredacted cables. On 31 August, WikiLeaks tweeted a link to a torrent of the encrypted data. On 1 September 2011, WikiLeaks announced that an encrypted version of the un-redacted US State Department cables had been available via BitTorrent for months and that the decryption key was available. WikiLeaks said that on 2 September it would publish the entire, unredacted archive in searchable form on its website. According to Assange, Wikileaks did this so that possible targets could be informed and better defend themselves, and also to provide a reliable source for the leaks.

Glenn Greenwald wrote that "WikiLeaks decided -- quite reasonably -- that the best and safest course was to release all the cables in full, so that not only the world's intelligence agencies but everyone had them, so that steps could be taken to protect the sources and so that the information in them was equally available". The unredacted cables were published by Cryptome on 1 September, the day before Wikileaks, and they remain on the Cryptome site. According to the website owner and operator "no US law enforcement authority has notified me that this publication of the cables is illegal, consists or contributes to a crime in any way, nor have they asked for them to be removed". The US cited the release in the opening of its request for extradition of Assange, saying his actions put lives at risk. The defence gave evidence it said would show that Assange was careful to protect lives.

The Guardian wrote that the decision to publish the cables in a searchable form was made by Assange alone, a decision that it, and its four previous media partners, condemned. According to The Guardian, several thousand files in the archive were marked "strictly protect" which indicated officials thought sources could be endangered by their release. In a joint statement, The Guardian, El Pais, New York Times and Der Spiegel said they "deplore the decision of WikiLeaks to publish the unredacted state department cables, which may put sources at risk" and "we cannot defend the needless publication of the complete data - indeed, we are united in condemning it." Le Monde told the Associated Press it would also sign the statement. In response, WikiLeaks accused The Guardian of false statements and nepotism. Out of concern for those involved, Reporters Without Borders temporarily suspended their WikiLeaks mirror.

According to media reports, after WikiLeaks published the unredacted cables , Ethiopian journalist Argaw Ashine was interrogated several times about a reference to him in a cable talking to a government source. The source told him about plans to arrest the editors of the critical Ethiopian weekly Addis Neger, who fled the country a month after talking to Ashine. Ashine was subjected to government harassment and intimidation, and was forced to flee the country.

2011–2015 

In late April 2011, files related to the Guantanamo prison were released. In December 2011, WikiLeaks started to release the Spy Files. On 27 February 2012, WikiLeaks began publishing more than five million emails from the Texas-headquartered "global intelligence" company Stratfor. On 5 July 2012, WikiLeaks began publishing the Syria Files (emails from Syrian political figures 2006–2012). On 25 October 2012, WikiLeaks began publishing The Detainee Policies, files covering the rules and procedures for detainees in US military custody. In April 2013 WikiLeaks published more than 1.7 million US diplomatic and intelligence documents from the 1970s, including the Kissinger cables.

In September 2013, WikiLeaks published "Spy Files 3", 250 documents from more than 90 surveillance companies. On 13 November 2013, a draft of the Trans-Pacific Partnership's Intellectual Property Rights chapter was published by WikiLeaks. On 10 June 2015, WikiLeaks published the draft on the Trans-Pacific Partnership's Transparency for Healthcare Annex, along with each country's negotiating position. On 19 June 2015 WikiLeaks began publishing The Saudi Cables: more than half a million cables and other documents from the Saudi Foreign Ministry that contain secret communications from various Saudi Embassies around the world.

In June and July 2015, WikiLeaks published a series of documents on NSA spying, which showed that NSA spied on the French, German, Brazilian and Japanese governments. The documents also detailed an economic espionage against French companies and associations and extensive monitoring of the Japanese economy and Japanese companies such as Mitsubishi and Mitsui. 

On 29 July 2015, WikiLeaks published a top secret letter from the Trans-Pacific Partnership Agreement (TPP) Ministerial Meeting in December 2013 which illustrated the position of negotiating countries on "state-owned enterprises" (SOEs). On 21 October 2015 WikiLeaks published some of John O. Brennan's emails, including a draft security clearance application which contained personal information.

2016 

During the 2016 US Democratic Party presidential primaries, WikiLeaks hosted emails sent or received by presidential candidate Hillary Clinton from her personal mail server while she was Secretary of State. The emails had been released by the US State Department under a Freedom of information request in February 2016. WikiLeaks also created a search engine to allow the public to search through Clinton's emails. The emails were selected in terms of their relevance to the Iraq War and were apparently timed to precede the release of the UK government's Iraq Inquiry report.

On 19 July 2016, in response to the Turkish government's purges that followed the coup attempt, WikiLeaks released 294,548 emails from Turkey's ruling Justice and Development party (AKP). According to WikiLeaks, the material, which they claim to be the first batch from the "AKP Emails", was obtained a week before the attempted coup in the country and "is not connected, in any way, to the elements behind the attempted coup, or to a rival political party or state". After WikiLeaks announced that they would release the emails, the organisation was for over 24 hours under a "sustained attack". Following the leak, the Turkish government ordered the site to be blocked nationwide.

Most experts and commentators agree that Phineas Fisher was behind the leak. Fisher said WikiLeaks had told her that the emails were "all spam and crap." Fisher asked WikiLeaks not to publish the AKP emails as she was still accessing files on the AKP network. After WikiLeaks published the emails, the AKP shut down its internal network and Fisher lost access.

On 22 July 2016, WikiLeaks released approximately 20,000 emails and 8,000 files sent from or received by Democratic National Committee (DNC) personnel. Some of the emails contained personal information of donors, including home addresses and Social Security numbers. Other emails appeared to criticise Bernie Sanders or showed favouritism towards Clinton during the primaries. Emails showed that the DNC shared debate questions with Clinton in advance. In July 2016, Debbie Wasserman Schultz resigned as chairwoman of the Democratic National Committee (DNC) because the emails released by WikiLeaks showed that the DNC was "effectively an arm of Mrs. Clinton's campaign" and had conspired to sabotage Bernie Sanders's campaign.

On 7 October 2016, WikiLeaks started releasing series of emails and documents sent from or received by Hillary Clinton campaign manager, John Podesta, including Hillary Clinton's paid speeches to banks, including Goldman Sachs. The BBC reported that the release "is unlikely to allay fears among liberal Democrats that she is too cosy with Wall Street". According to a spokesman for the Clinton campaign, "By dribbling these out every day WikiLeaks is proving they are nothing but a propaganda arm of the Kremlin with a political agenda doing Vladimir Putin's dirty work to help elect Donald Trump." The New York Times reported that when asked, President Vladimir Putin replied that Russia was being falsely accused. "The hysteria is merely caused by the fact that somebody needs to divert the attention of the American people from the essence of what was exposed by the hackers."

On 25 November 2016, WikiLeaks released emails and internal documents that provided details on the US military operations in Yemen from 2009 to March 2015. In a statement accompanying the release of the "Yemen Files", Assange said about the US involvement in the Yemen war: "Although the United States government has provided most of the bombs and is deeply involved in the conduct of the war itself reportage on the war in English is conspicuously rare".

In December 2016, WikiLeaks published over 57,000 emails from Erdogan's son-in-law, Berat Albayrak, who was Turkey's Minister of Energy and Natural Resources. The emails show the inner workings of the Turkish government. According to WikiLeaks, the emails had been first released by Redhack.

2017 

On 16 February 2017, WikiLeaks released a purported report on CIA espionage orders (marked as NOFORN) for the 2012 French presidential election. The order called for details of party funding, internal rivalries and future attitudes toward the United States. The Associated Press noted that "the orders seemed to represent standard intelligence-gathering."

On 7 March 2017, WikiLeaks started publishing content code-named "Vault 7", describing it as containing CIA internal documentation of their "massive arsenal" of hacking tools including malware, viruses, weaponised "zero day" exploits and remote control systems. Leaked documents, dated from 2013 to 2016, detail the capabilities of the United States Central Intelligence Agency (CIA) to perform electronic surveillance and cyber warfare, such as the ability to compromise cars, smart TVs, web browsers (including Google Chrome, Microsoft Edge, Mozilla Firefox, and Opera Software ASA), and the operating systems of most smartphones (including Apple's iOS and Google's Android), as well as other operating systems such as Microsoft Windows, macOS, and Linux.

On 5 May 2017, WikiLeaks posted links to e-mails purported to be from Emmanuel Macron's campaign in the French 2017 presidential election, who indicated they did not author the leaks. Some experts have said that the WikiLeaks Twitter account played a key role in publicising the leaks through the hashtag #MacronLeaks just some three-and-a-half hours after the first tweet with the hashtag appeared. France's Electoral Commission urged journalists not to report on the contents of the leaks, but to heed "the sense of responsibility they must demonstrate, as at stake are the free expression of voters and the sincerity of the election." The campaign stated that false documents were mixed in with real ones. In July, WikiLeaks made searchable 21,000 Macron emails it said were verified.

In September 2017, WikiLeaks released "Spy Files Russia," revealing "how a St. Petersburg-based technology company called Peter-Service helped state entities gather detailed data on Russian cellphone users, part of a national system of online surveillance called System for Operative Investigative Activities (SORM)." Andrei Soldatov, a Russian journalist specialising in digital surveillance and Russian intelligence said he didn't think it was a real expose but "I decided that I need to praise this release, because it’s more than nothing. At least we got some hint about the data exchange interface between telecoms and secret services." According to Moscow-based journalist Fred Weir, "experts say it casts a timely spotlight on the vast surveillance operations mounted by Russian security services." Some suggested that Spy Files Russia was an approved release by the Russian government meant to shield them from criticism of collusion with WikiLeaks after the 2016 US presidential election. James Andrew Lewis, a vice-president at Center for Strategic and International Studies, said they were "tricks that the Russians were willing to give up."

2019 

In November 2019, WikiLeaks released an email from an unnamed investigator from the Organisation for the Prohibition of Chemical Weapons (OPCW) team investigating the 2018 chemical attack in Douma (Syria). The investigator accused the OPCW of covering up discrepancies. Robert Fisk said that documents released by WikiLeaks indicated that the OPCW "suppressed or failed to publish, or simply preferred to ignore, the conclusions of up to 20 other members of its staff who became so upset at what they regarded as the misleading conclusions of the final report that they officially sought to have it changed in order to represent the truth". The head of OPCW, Fernando Arias, described the leak as containing "subjective views" and stood by the original conclusions.

In April 2018, WikiLeaks had offered a $100,000 reward for confidential information about "the alleged chemical attack in Douma, Syria." In a November 2020 interview with BBC, WikiLeaks' alleged source declined to say if he took money from the organisation.

On 12 November 2019, WikiLeaks began publishing what it called the Fishrot Files (Icelandic: Samherjaskjölin), a collection of thousands of documents and email communication by employees of one of Iceland's largest fish industry companies, Samherji, that indicated that the company had paid hundreds of millions Icelandic króna to high ranking politicians and officials in Namibia with the objective of acquiring the country's coveted fishing quota.

2021 

In 2021, WikiLeaks made a searchable database of 17,000 publicly available documents, which it called The Intolerance Network, from the ultra-conservative Spanish Catholic organisation Hazte Oir and its international arm, CitizenGo. The documents reveal the internal workings of the organisations, their network of donors and their relationship with the Vatican. The release also includes documents from the secret Catholic organisation El Yunque. The editor of WikiLeaks, Kristinn Hrafnsson, said "As ultra right-wing political groups have gained strength in recent years, with increasing attacks on women's and LGBT rights, it is valuable to have access to documents from those who have lobbied for those changes on a global basis". According to WikiLeaks, the documents were first released in 2017.

Authenticity 
According to Wired in 2009, a "whistleblower" submitted fabricated documents to WikiLeaks. The documents were published and flagged as potential fakes. WikiLeaks stated in 2010 that it has never released a misattributed document and that documents are assessed before release. In response to concerns about the possibility of misleading or fraudulent leaks, WikiLeaks has stated that misleading leaks "are already well-placed in the mainstream media. WikiLeaks is of no additional assistance." The FAQ states that: "The simplest and most effective countermeasure is a worldwide community of informed users and editors who can scrutinise and discuss leaked documents." According to statements by Assange in 2010, submitted documents were vetted by five reviewers with expertise in different topics such as language or programming, who also investigated the leaker's identity if known. Assange had the final say in document assessment.

Columnist Eric Zorn wrote in 2016 "So far, it's possible, even likely, that every stolen email WikiLeaks has posted has been authentic," but cautioned against assuming that future releases would be equally authentic. Writer Glenn Greenwald stated in 2016 that WikiLeaks has a "perfect, long-standing record of only publishing authentic documents." Cybersecurity experts have said that it would be easy for a person to fabricate an email or alter it, as by changing headers and metadata.

Some of the releases, including many of the Podesta emails, contain DKIM headers. This allows them to be verified as genuine to some degree of certainty.

In July 2016, the Aspen Institute's Homeland Security Group, a bipartisan counterterrorism organisation, warned that hackers who stole authentic data might "salt the files they release with plausible forgeries." According to Douglas Perry, Russian intelligence agencies have frequently used disinformation tactics. He wrote in 2016 that "carefully faked emails might be included in the WikiLeaks dumps. After all, the best way to make false information believable is to mix it in with true information."

Promotion of false conspiracy theories

Murder of Seth Rich 

WikiLeaks promoted conspiracy theories about the murder of Seth Rich. Unfounded conspiracy theories, spread by some right-wing figures and media outlets, hold that Rich was the source of leaked emails and was killed for working with WikiLeaks. WikiLeaks fuelled such theories when it offered a $20,000 reward for information on Rich's killer and when Assange implied that Rich was the source of the DNC leaks, although no evidence supports that claim. Special Counsel Robert Mueller's report into Russian interference in the 2016 election said that Assange "implied falsely" that Rich was the source in order to obscure that Russia was the actual source.

Democratic Party and Hillary Clinton 

WikiLeaks popularised conspiracy theories about the Democratic Party and Hillary Clinton, such as tweeting articles which suggested Clinton campaign chairman John Podesta engaged in satanic rituals, implying that the Democratic Party had Seth Rich killed, claiming that Hillary Clinton wanted to drone strike Assange, suggesting that Clinton wore earpieces to debates and interviews, promoting thinly sourced theories about Clinton's health and according to Bloomberg creating "anti-Clinton theories out of whole cloth", and promoting a conspiracy theory from a Donald Trump-related Internet community tying the Clinton campaign to child kidnapper Laura Silsby.

Promotion of false flag theories 

On the day the Vault 7 documents were first released, WikiLeaks described UMBRAGE as "a substantial library of attack techniques 'stolen' from malware produced in other states including the Russian Federation," and tweeted, "CIA steals other groups virus and malware facilitating false flag attacks." A conspiracy theory soon emerged alleging that the CIA framed the Russian government for interfering in the 2016 U.S. elections. Conservative commentators such as Sean Hannity and Ann Coulter speculated about this possibility on Twitter, and Rush Limbaugh discussed it on his radio show. Russian foreign minister Sergey Lavrov said that Vault 7 showed that "the CIA could get access to such 'fingerprints' and then use them."

Cybersecurity writers, such as Ben Buchanan and Kevin Poulsen, were sceptical of those theories. Poulsen wrote, "The leaked catalog isn't organized by country of origin, and the specific malware used by the Russian DNC hackers is nowhere on the list."

In April 2017, the WikiLeaks Twitter account suggested that the Khan Shaykhun chemical attack, which international human rights organisations and governments of the United States, United Kingdom, Turkey, Saudi Arabia, France, and Israel attributed to the Syrian government, was a false flag attack. WikiLeaks stated that "while western establishment media beat the drum for more war in Syria the matter is far from clear", and shared a video by a Syrian activist who claimed that Islamist extremists were probably behind the chemical attack, not the Syrian government.

Reception

Awards and support 

WikiLeaks won The Economists New Media Award in 2008 at the Index on Censorship Awards and Amnesty International's UK Media Award in 2009. In 2010, the New York Daily News listed WikiLeaks first among websites "that could totally change the news". Julian Assange received the 2010 Sam Adams Award for Integrity in Intelligence for releasing secret U.S. military reports on the Iraq and Afghan wars and was named the Readers' Choice for TIME's Person of the Year in 2010. The UK Information Commissioner has stated that "WikiLeaks is part of the phenomenon of the online, empowered citizen". In 2010, an Internet petition in support of WikiLeaks attracted more than six hundred thousand signatures.

On 16 April 2019, Mairead Maguire accepted the 2019 GUE/NGL Award for Journalists, Whistleblowers & Defenders of the Right to Information on Julian Assange's behalf.

Improving government and corporate transparency 

During the early years of WikiLeaks, various members of the media and academia commended it for exposing state and corporate secrets, increasing transparency, assisting freedom of the press, and enhancing democratic discourse while challenging powerful institutions. In 2010, the UN High Commissioner for Human Rights expressed concern over the "cyber war" being led at the time against WikiLeaks, and in a joint statement with the Organization of American States the UN Special Rapporteur called on states and other people to keep international legal principles in mind.

2016 U.S. presidential election

Allegations of anti-Clinton and pro-Trump bias 

Assange wrote on WikiLeaks in February 2016: "I have had years of experience in dealing with Hillary Clinton and have read thousands of her cables. Hillary lacks judgement and will push the United States into endless, stupid wars which spread terrorism. ...  she certainly should not become president of the United States." In a 2017 interview by Amy Goodman, Julian Assange said that choosing between Hillary Clinton and Donald Trump is like choosing between cholera or gonorrhea. "Personally, I would prefer neither." WikiLeaks editor Sarah Harrison stated that the site was not choosing which damaging publications to release, rather releasing information available to them. In conversations that were leaked in February 2018, Assange expressed a preference for a Republican victory in the 2016 election, saying that "Dems+Media+liberals would [sic] then form a block to reign [sic] in their worst qualities. With Hillary in charge, GOP will be pushing for her worst qualities, dems+media+neoliberals will be mute." In further leaked correspondence with the Trump campaign on election day (8 November 2016), WikiLeaks encouraged the Trump campaign to contest the election results as being "rigged" should they lose.

Having released information that exposed the inner workings of a broad range of organisations and politicians, WikiLeaks started by 2016 to focus almost exclusively on Democratic presidential candidate Hillary Clinton. In the 2016 U.S. presidential election, WikiLeaks only exposed material damaging to the Democratic National Committee and Hillary Clinton. WikiLeaks even rejected the opportunity to publish unrelated leaks, because it dedicated all its resources to Hillary Clinton and the Democratic Party. According to The New York Times, WikiLeaks timed one of its large leaks so that it would happen on the eve of the Democratic Convention. The Washington Post noted that the leaks came at an important sensitive moment in the Clinton campaign, as she was preparing to announce her vice-presidential pick and unite the party behind her. The Sunlight Foundation, an organisation that advocates for open government, said that such actions meant that WikiLeaks was no longer striving to be transparent but rather sought to achieve political goals.

WikiLeaks explained its actions in a 2017 statement to Foreign Policy: "WikiLeaks schedules publications to maximize readership and reader engagement. During distracting media events such as the Olympics or a high profile election, unrelated publications are sometimes delayed until the distraction passes but never are rejected for this reason." On 7 October 2016, an hour after the media had begun to dedicate wall-to-wall coverage of the revelation that Trump had bragged on video about sexually harassing women, WikiLeaks began to release emails hacked from the personal account of Clinton campaign chairman John Podesta. Podesta suggested that the emails were timed to deflect attention from the Trump tapes.

Secret correspondence between WikiLeaks and Donald Trump Jr. 

In November 2017, it was revealed that the WikiLeaks Twitter account secretly corresponded with Donald Trump Jr. during the 2016 presidential election. The correspondence shows how WikiLeaks actively solicited the co-operation of Trump Jr., a campaign surrogate and advisor in the campaign of his father. WikiLeaks urged the Trump campaign to reject the results of the 2016 presidential election at a time when it looked as if the Trump campaign would lose. WikiLeaks suggested the Trump campaign leak Trump's taxes to them. WikiLeaks asked Trump Jr. to share a WikiLeaks tweet with the quote "Can't we just drone this guy?" which True Pundit alleged Hillary Clinton made about Assange. WikiLeaks also shared a link to a site that would help people to search through WikiLeaks documents. Trump Jr. shared both. After the election, WikiLeaks also requested that the president-elect push Australia to appoint Assange as ambassador to the US. Trump Jr. provided this correspondence to congressional investigators looking into Russian interference in the 2016 election.

The secretive exchanges led to criticism of WikiLeaks by some former supporters. Assange had asserted the Clinton campaign was "constantly slandering" WikiLeaks of being a 'pro-Trump' 'pro-Russia' source. Journalist Barrett Brown, a long-time defender of WikiLeaks, was exasperated that Assange was "complaining about 'slander' of being pro-Trump IN THE ACTUAL COURSE OF COLLABORATING WITH TRUMP". He also wrote: "Was "Wikileaks staff" lying on Nov 10 2016 when they claimed "The allegations that we have colluded with Trump, or any other candidate for that matter, or with Russia, are just groundless and false", or did Assange lie to them?"

Brown said Assange had acted "as a covert political operative", thus betraying WikiLeaks' focus on exposing "corporate and government wrongdoing". He considered the latter to be "an appropriate thing to do", but that "working with an authoritarian would-be leader to deceive the public is indefensible and disgusting".

Allegations of association with Russian government 

According to the Associated Press, leaked documents from WikiLeaks include an unsigned letter from Julian Assange authorising Israel Shamir to seek a Russian visa on his behalf in 2010. WikiLeaks said Assange never applied for the visa or wrote the letter.

In 2012, as WikiLeaks was under a financial blockade, Assange began to host World Tomorrow, a television show that was distributed by Journeyman Pictures and aired on RT.

In 2013, the Russian national newspaper Izvestia reported that Russian intelligence officers had coordinated with WikiLeaks to get Edward Snowden's flight from Hong Kong to Moscow had been co-ordinated with Russian authorities and intelligence services. Snowden was accompanied by Wikileaks employee Sarah Harrison. Izvestia reported that Snowden and Harrison intended to stay in Moscow for a short time before taking an Aeroflot flight to Cuba, and from there travel to Venezuela. In 2015, Assange told reporters that he had told Snowden to take asylum in Russia instead of Ecuador because Russia was one of the few places in the world where the CIA’s influence did not reach. The Guardian wrote that this was at odds with WikiLeaks' statement at the time that Snowden became stranded in Russia after his US passport was revoked.

In 2015, it was reported by  that Assange requested he be allowed to "choose his own Security Service inside the embassy, suggesting the use of Russians". The article said the then Ecuadorian intelligence service SENAIN said "would have been the equivalent of 'a coup in the embassy'."

In April 2016, WikiLeaks tweeted criticism of the Panama Papers, which had among other things revealed Russian businesses and individuals linked with offshore ties. Assange said that journalists had "cherry-picked" documents to maximise "Putin bashing, North Korea bashing, sanctions bashing, etc." while avoiding mention of Western figures. The WikiLeaks Twitter account tweeted, "#PanamaPapers Putin attack was produced by OCCRP which targets Russia & former USSR and was funded by USAID and [George] Soros". Putin later dismissed the Panama Papers by citing WikiLeaks: "WikiLeaks has showed us that official people and official organs of the U.S. are behind this." According to The New York Times "there is no evidence suggesting that the United States government had a role in releasing the Panama Papers".

In August 2016, after WikiLeaks published thousands of DNC emails, DNC officials and a number of cybersecurity experts and cybersecurity firms claimed that Russian intelligence had hacked the e-mails and leaked them to WikiLeaks. Assange said that Russia was not the source of the documents and that the Clinton campaign was stoking "a neo-McCarthy hysteria". In October 2016, the US intelligence community said that it was "confident that the Russian Government directed the recent compromises of e-mails from U.S. persons and institutions, including from U.S. political organizations". The US intelligence agencies said that the hacks were consistent with the methods of Russian-directed efforts, and that people high up within the Kremlin were likely involved. On 14 October 2016, CNN stated that "there is mounting evidence that the Russian government is supplying WikiLeaks with hacked emails pertaining to the U.S. presidential election."

WikiLeaks said it had no connection with Russia. When asked about Guccifer 2.0's leaks, WikiLeaks founder Julian Assange said "These look very much like they’re from the Russians. But in some ways, they look very amateur, and almost look too much like the Russians." President Putin stated that there was no Russian involvement in the election. In August 2016, a New York Times story asked whether WikiLeaks had "become a laundering machine for compromising material gathered by Russian spies". It wrote that US officials believed it was unlikely there were direct ties between Wikileaks and Russian intelligence agencies. A report by the Central Intelligence Agency shared with senators in 2016 concluded that Russia intelligence operatives provided materials to WikiLeaks in an effort to help Donald Trump's election bid.

In September 2016, the Daily Dot wrote that according to leaked court documents and a chatlog, a WikiLeaks release excluded evidence of a €2 billion transaction between the Syrian government and a government-owned Russian bank. Responding to the Daily Dot, WikiLeaks said that all the Syria files they had obtained had been published. Their spokesperson also stated, in reference to the Daily Dot's reporting of the story: "Go right ahead, but you can be sure we will return the favour one day."

In December 2016, Julian Assange said that WikiLeaks wasn't necessary in Russia because there are "competitors to WikiLeaks" and the "many vibrant publications, online blogs, and Kremlin critics" like "Novaya Gazeta, in which different parts of society in Moscow are permitted to critique each other." Assange also cited WikiLeaks not havin staff that spoke Russian and being focused on English-speaking cultures. Salon, the Guardian and others criticised Assange for being "dishonest" about Russia. In 2010, WikiLeaks had announced a partnership with Novaya Gazeta to begin releasing information on Russian government corruption.

In March 2017, The Moscow Times wrote that a former WikiLeaks collaborator said that "in recent years, WikiLeaks and the Russian state have effectively joined forces." The article reported that, since submissions to the Wikileaks portal are anonymous and encrypted, it was very difficult for Wikileaks to trace their source. Mark Galeotti, a researcher at the Institute of International Relations Prague and an expert on the Russian security services, said he had suspicions "that things are sometimes fed in, and [WikiLeaks does] know where they came from." Galeotti said Assange would have to be "extraordinarily stupid and naive" not to conclude the DNC leaks came from Russia. According to the Mueller indictment, WikiLeaks knew the source was the Russian Guccifer 2.0 persona.

In April 2017, CIA Director Mike Pompeo stated: "It is time to call out WikiLeaks for what it really is – a non-state hostile intelligence service often abetted by state actors like Russia." Pompeo said that the US Intelligence Community had concluded that Russia's "primary propaganda outlet," RT had "actively collaborated" with WikiLeaks.

In August 2017, Foreign Policy wrote that WikiLeaks had in the summer of 2016 turned down a large cache of documents containing information damaging to the Russian government. WikiLeaks stated that, "As far as we recall these are already public ... WikiLeaks rejects all information that it cannot verify. WikiLeaks rejects submissions that have already been published elsewhere". News outlets had reported on contents of the leaks in 2014, amounting to less than half of the data that was allegedly made available to WikiLeaks in the summer of 2016.

In September 2018, The Guardian reported that Russian diplomats had secret talks with people close to Julian Assange in 2017 with plans to help him flee the UK Several possible destinations were suggested, including Russia. The Russian embassy denied the report. It was also reported that Ecuador attempted to give Assange a diplomatic posting in Russia, but Britain refused to give him diplomatic immunity to leave the embassy. In October 2018, this was confirmed by documents released by Ecuador.

Exaggerated and misleading descriptions of the contents of leaks 

WikiLeaks has been criticised for making misleading claims about the contents of its leaks. According to University of North Carolina Professor Zeynep Tufekci, this is part of a pattern of behaviour. According to Tufekci, there are three steps to WikiLeaks' "disinformation campaigns": "The first step is to dump many documents at once — rather than allowing journalists to scrutinise them and absorb their significance before publication. The second step is to sensationalise the material with misleading news releases and tweets. The third step is to sit back and watch as the news media unwittingly promotes the WikiLeaks agenda under the auspices of independent reporting."

WikiLeaks was criticised for misleading descriptions about AKP emails it said were from Turkey's ruling political party when journalists reported they were mostly newsletters and spam. Most experts and commentators agree that Phineas Fisher was behind the AKP email leak. Fisher said WikiLeaks had told her that the emails were "all spam and crap" but published them anyway despite being asked not to.

In 2017, The Intercept criticised WikiLeaks for some of its claims about Vault 7 and supply chain attacks. According to The Intercept, "WikiLeaks is stretching the facts beyond what it has published" and "the documents provided here are deeply interesting, but not worth the concern WikiLeaks generated by its public comments."

Selling access to leaks 

In 2008, WikiLeaks attempted to auction off the emails of an aide to Venezuelan President Hugo Chávez, drawing criticism. University of Minnesota media ethics professor Jane Kirtley asked, "Ethically speaking, why don't they just publish it?" WikiLeaks later posted the emails on their website. In 2010, Assange considered a subscription service which he said would continue the auction idea. High paying subscribers would get early access to leaks, with the size and ratio of subsciption fees deciding how far in advance bidders would get access. In 2012, WikiLeaks put the Global Intelligence files behind a paywall, drawing intense criticism from supporters including Anonymous.

Inadequate curation and violations of personal privacy 

WikiLeaks has drawn criticism for violating the personal privacy of individuals and inadequately curating its content. These critics include transparency advocates, such as Edward Snowden, Glenn Greenwald, Amnesty International, Reporters Without Borders, the Sunlight Foundation and the Federation of American Scientists.

Steven Aftergood of the Federation of American Scientists has opined that WikiLeaks "does not respect the rule of law nor does it honor the rights of individuals." Aftergood went on to state that WikiLeaks engages in unrestrained disclosure of non-governmental secrets without compelling public policy reasons and that many anti-corruption activists were opposed to the site's activities.

In 2010, Amnesty International joined several other human rights groups in strongly requesting that WikiLeaks redact the names of Afghan civilians working as U.S. military informants from files they had released, in order to protect them from repercussions. Julian Assange responded by offering Amnesty International the opportunity to assist in the tedious document vetting process. When Amnesty International appeared to express reservations in accepting the offer, Assange stated that he had "no time to deal with people who prefer to do nothing but cover their asses".

WikiLeaks has published individuals' Social Security numbers, medical information, and credit card numbers. An analysis by the Associated Press found that WikiLeaks had in one of its mass-disclosures published "the personal information of hundreds of people – including sick children, rape victims and mental health patients". WikiLeaks has named teenage rape victims, and outed an individual arrested for homosexuality in Saudi Arabia. Some of WikiLeaks' cables "described patients with psychiatric conditions, seriously ill children or refugees". An analysis of WikiLeaks' Saudi cables "turned up more than 500 passport, identity, academic or employment files ... three dozen records pertaining to family issues in the cables – including messages about marriages, divorces, missing children, elopements and custody battles. Many are very personal, like the marital certificates that proclaims whether the bride was a virgin. Others deal with Saudis who are deeply in debt, including one man who says his wife stole his money. One divorce document details a male partner's infertility. Others identify the partners of women suffering from sexually transmitted diseases including HIV and Hepatitis C." Two individuals named in the DNC leaks were targeted by identity thieves following WikiLeaks' release of their Social Security and credit card information. In its leak of DNC e-mails, WikiLeaks revealed the details of an ordinary staffer's suicide attempt and brought attention to it through a tweet.

WikiLeaks' publishing of Sony's hacked e-mails drew criticism for violating the privacy of Sony's employees and for failing to be in the public interest. Michael A. Cohen, a fellow at the Century Foundation, argues that "data dumps like these represent a threat to our already shrinking zone of privacy." He noted that the willingness of WikiLeaks to publish information of this type encourages hacking and cyber theft: "With ready and willing amplifiers, what's to deter the next cyberthief from stealing a company's database of information and threatening to send it to Wikileaks if a list of demands aren't met?"

The Sunlight Foundation, a nonprofit that advocates for open government, has criticised WikiLeaks for inadequate curation of its content and for "weaponised transparency," writing that with the DNC leaks, "Wikileaks again failed the due diligence review we expect of putatively journalistic entities when it published the personal information of ordinary citizens, including passport and Social Security numbers contained in the hacked emails of Democratic National Committee staff. We are not alone in raising ethical questions about Wikileaks' shift from whistleblower to platform for weaponised transparency. Any organisation that 'doxxes' a public is harming privacy." The manner in which WikiLeaks publishes content can have the effect of censoring political enemies: "Wikileaks' indiscriminate disclosure in this case is perhaps the closest we've seen in reality to the bogeyman projected by enemies to reform — that transparency is just a Trojan Horse for chilling speech and silencing political enemies."

In July 2016, Edward Snowden criticised WikiLeaks for insufficiently curating its content. When Snowden made data public, he did so by working with The Washington Post, the Guardian and other news organisations, choosing only to make documents public which exposed National Security Agency surveillance programs. Content that compromised national security or exposed sensitive personal information was withheld. WikiLeaks, on the other hand, made little effort to do either, Snowden said. WikiLeaks responded by accusing Snowden of pandering to Democratic presidential nominee Hillary Clinton. At the same time, Glenn Greenwald criticised WikiLeaks for refusing to redact, telling Slate "I definitely do not agree with that approach and think that they can be harmful to innocent people or other individuals in ways that I don’t think is acceptable."

In January 2017, the WikiLeaks Task Force, a Twitter account associated with WikiLeaks, proposed the creation of a database to track verified Twitter users, including sensitive personal information on individuals' homes, families and finances. According to the Chicago Tribune, "the proposal faced a sharp and swift backlash as technologists, journalists and security researchers slammed the idea as a 'sinister' and dangerous abuse of power and privacy."

Internal conflicts and lack of transparency 

In a 2010 interview with CNET.com former advisory board member John Young accused the organisation of a lack of transparency regarding its fundraising and financial management. He stated his belief that WikiLeaks could not guarantee whistleblowers the anonymity or confidentiality they claimed and that he "would not trust them with information if it had any value, or if it put me at risk or anyone that I cared about at risk." He later became supportive of the organisation again.

Those working for WikiLeaks are reportedly required to sign sweeping non-disclosure agreements covering all conversations, conduct, and material, with Assange having sole power over disclosure. The penalty for non-compliance in one such agreement was reportedly £12 million. WikiLeaks has been challenged for this practice, as it is seen to be hypocritical for an organisation dedicated to transparency to limit the transparency of its inner workings and limit the accountability of powerful individuals in the organisation.

Public positions taken by United States politicians concerning WikiLeaks 

In 2010, after WikiLeaks' release of classified U.S. government documents leaked by Chelsea Manning, then U.S. Vice-President Joe Biden was asked whether he saw Assange as closer to a high-tech terrorist than to Pentagon Papers whistleblower Daniel Ellsberg. Biden responded that he "would argue it is closer to being a high-tech terrorist than the Pentagon Papers". Biden said Assange "has done things that have damaged and put in jeopardy the lives and occupations of people in other parts of the world." Representative Pete Hoekstra called for decisive action against WikiLeaks. Senator Joseph Lieberman and John McCain called WikiLeaks publications the "greatest, most damaging security breach in the history of this country" and Senator Peter T. King said WikiLeaks was "engaged in terrorist activity" and should be designated a terrorist organisation. Senator John Ensign proposed amending the Espionage Act to target WikiLeaks.

Internal U.S. government reviews found that the redacted diplomatic cables leak was embarrassing but caused only limited damage to U.S. interests abroad. In January 2011, a congressional official said they thought the Obama administration felt compelled to say publicly that the release caused severe damage in order to bolster legal efforts to shut down the WikiLeaks website and bring charges against the leakers.

In 2015, Representative Mac Thornberry said WikiLeaks publications had done "enormous" damage and helped the country's "primary adversaries".

Several Republicans who had once been highly critical of WikiLeaks and Julian Assange began to speak fondly of him after WikiLeaks published the DNC leaks and started to regularly criticise Hillary Clinton and the Democratic Party. Having called WikiLeaks "disgraceful" in 2010, President-elect Donald Trump praised WikiLeaks in October 2016, saying, "I love WikiLeaks." In 2019, Trump said "I know nothing about WikiLeaks. It's not my thing." Newt Gingrich, who called for Assange to be "treated as an enemy combatant" in 2010, praised him as a "down to Earth, straight forward interviewee" in 2017. Sarah Palin, who had in 2010 described Assange as an "anti-American operative with blood on his hands", praised Assange in 2017.

Representative Ron Paul defended WikiLeaks in a floor speech. Tulsi Gabbard spoke of the "chilling effect on investigative journalism", first of the US government's reclassification of WikiLeaks (from "news organization" during the Obama administration to "hostile intelligence service" after the 2016 election), then of his arrest.

Cultural references 

 Mediastan is a documentary released in 2013, directed by Johannes Wahlström, produced by Ken Loach's company Sixteen Films and featuring the people behind WikiLeaks. The film debuted at the Raindance Film Festival. It was released for free online to counter The Fifth Estate which was released at the same time.
 Underground: The Julian Assange Story is a biography movie of the early life of Julian Assange, directed by Robert Connolly.
 The documentary We Steal Secrets: The Story of WikiLeaks by director Alex Gibney premiered at the 2013 Sundance Film Festival. WikiLeaks released a complete, annotated transcript of the film prior to its release. WikiLeaks criticised the film for containing dozens of factual errors and instances of "sleight of hand". It also criticised the film's depiction of Chelsea Manning's decision to leak US military and diplomatic documents as "a failure of character, rather than a triumph of conscience".
 The Fifth Estate is a film directed by Bill Condon, starring Benedict Cumberbatch as Assange. The film is based on WikiLeaks defector Domscheit-Berg's book Inside WikiLeaks: My Time with Julian Assange and the World's Most Dangerous Website, as well as WikiLeaks: Inside Julian Assange's War on Secrecy by David Leigh and Luke Harding. WikiLeaks leaked the full script of the film prior to its release and criticised both books on which the film was based as "inaccurate and libellous". WikiLeaks said that the film was "careful to avoid most criticism of US foreign policy actually revealed by WikiLeaks" and covered "almost none of the evidence WikiLeaks published that year of serious abuses within the US military and the State Department". It said the film contained fabrications which had the effect of obscuring the benefits of WikiLeaks' releases and demonising Assange.
 War, Lies and Videotape is a documentary by French directors Paul Moreira and Luc Hermann from press agency Premieres Lignes. The film was first released in France, in 2011 and then broadcast worldwide.
 The Source is a 2014 oratorio by Ted Hearne, with a libretto by Mark Doten that features WikiLeaks document disclosures by Chelsea Manning.
 The War on Journalism: The Case of Julian Assange is a 2020 documentary by Juan Passarelli.
 A Secret Australia: Revealed by the WikiLeaks Exposés  was published in December 2020. The book contains 18 essays by Julian Burnside, Antony Loewenstein, Scott Ludlam, Helen Razer and others about how WikiLeaks has affected the Australian media and the Australian government's connections to the US intelligence and military industries.

Spin-offs 

Release of United States diplomatic cables was followed by the creation of a number of other organisations based on the WikiLeaks model. According to Andy Greenberg there were more than 50 projects inspired by WikiLeaks in 2012, including GreenLeaks, BalkanLeaks, IndoLeaks, BrusselsLeaks and EnviroLeaks. WikiLeaks spokesman Kristinn Hrafnsson responded to the idea positively, saying that having more organisations like WikiLeaks was good.

 OpenLeaks was created by a former WikiLeaks spokesperson. Daniel Domscheit-Berg said the intention was to be more transparent than WikiLeaks. OpenLeaks was supposed to start public operations in early 2011 but despite much media coverage,  it is not operating.
 In December 2011, WikiLeaks launched Friends of WikiLeaks, a social network for supporters and founders of the website.
 On 9 September 2013 a number of major Dutch media outlets supported the launch of Publeaks, which provides a secure website for people to leak documents to the media using the GlobaLeaks whistleblowing software.
 RuLeaks was launched in December 2010 to translate and mirror publications by WikiLeaks. In January 2011, it started to publish its own content as well.
 Leakymails is a project designed to obtain and publish relevant documents exposing corruption of the political class and the powerful in Argentina.
 Distributed Denial of Secrets is a whistleblower site founded in 2018. Sometimes referred to as an alternative to WikiLeaks, it's best known for its publication of a large collection of internal police documents, known as BlueLeaks. The site has also published data on Russian oligarchs, fascist groups, shell companies, tax havens, banking in the Caymans and the Parler leak.

See also 

 Assange v Swedish Prosecution Authority
 Chilling Effects
 Classified information in the United States
 Data activism
 Digital rights
 Freedom of information
 Freedom of the Press Foundation
 ICWATCH
 Information warfare
 New York Times Co. v. United States
 Open society
 1993 PGP criminal investigation
 Russian interference in the 2016 United States elections

References

External links 

 
 Courage Foundation official website An organisation that supports whistleblowers and political prisoners

2006 establishments in Australia
Applications of cryptography
Classified documents
Espionage
Information sensitivity
Internet censorship by organization
Internet leaks
Internet properties established in 2006
Internet services shut down by a legal challenge
MediaWiki websites
National security
News leaks
Online archives
Online organizations
Open government
Organizations associated with Russian interference in the 2016 United States elections
Organizations established in 2006
Whistleblowing